The 2009 Liberty Bowl was a college football postseason bowl game played at Liberty Bowl Memorial Stadium in Memphis, Tennessee, on January 2, 2009. The 50th edition of the Liberty Bowl, it was the first edition ever played in January. With sponsorship from AutoZone, the game was officially the AutoZone Liberty Bowl. The game featured the East Carolina Pirates of Conference USA (C-USA) and the Kentucky Wildcats of the Southeastern Conference (SEC). Kentucky overcame a 13-point halftime deficit to win, 25–19.

Background
East Carolina accepted an invitation to the bowl after their victory over the Tulsa Golden Hurricane in the 2008 C-USA Championship Game. East Carolina entered the game with a record of 9-4 and had been ranked as high as No. 15 in the AP Poll during the season. Kentucky was 6–6 and unranked.

Game summary
East Carolina led through much of the game. However, late in the fourth quarter, Kentucky defensive tackle Ventrell Jenkins picked up a fumble and returned it 56 yards for the game-winning touchdown. Jenkins was named the MVP of the game.  The fumble recovery and return, marked by a vicious stiff arm Jenkins put on the opposing quarterback, received generous replay during bowl game broadcasts.

Scoring summary

References

Liberty Bowl
Liberty Bowl
East Carolina Pirates football bowl games
Kentucky Wildcats football bowl games
Liberty Bowl
Liberty Bowl